Heinrich Diederick Steyl (born 6 July 1990 in Bellville, South Africa) is a South African rugby union player, who most recently played with the . His regular position is fullback or winger.

Career

Youth

In 2008, he was a member of the Western Province Under-18 squad that played at the Academy Week tournament. In 2011, he was part of the  squad that lost in the semi-finals of the 2011 Under-21 Provincial Championship. He also won an award for the most promising Under-21 player at the union's end-of-season awards ceremony.

Western Province

He was included in the  squad for the 2011 Currie Cup Premier Division competition. However, he suffered a broken leg during the match and was ruled out for the season. Despite being named in their squad for the 2012 Currie Cup Premier Division, he failed to make any further appearances for the Cape Town-based side.

Blue Bulls

However, he failed to make an impact and returned to the Western Cape where he joined club side Durbanville-Bellville for a few months.

Ordizia

He then moved to Spain, where he played for División de Honor side Ordizia for the 2013–14 season. He helped them to sixth place in the competition, before they lost in the quarter-finals to CR Cisneros. Steyl scored 185 points during his season at the club to finish sixth in the overall points scoring charts.

Pumas

He returned to South Africa after the 2013–14 División de Honor de Rugby to join Nelspruit-based side the  prior to the 2014 Currie Cup Premier Division season.

He was a member of the Pumas side that won the Vodacom Cup for the first time in 2015, beating  24–7 in the final. Steyl made three appearances during the season, scoring two tries.

References

1990 births
Living people
Blue Bulls players
Pumas (Currie Cup) players
Rugby union players from Bellville, South Africa
South African rugby union players
Western Province (rugby union) players
Rugby union fullbacks